Ġebel San Pietru is a hill located on Għargħur Hill in Għargħur, Malta, with an altitude of 150 metres (492 ft). Foreigners call it the Top of The World, whilst the locals call it L-Anċirietka. Locals and tourists often hike here. 

Għaxqet L-Għajn is the road which passes through the hill.

The Victoria Lines are located nearby.

See also
 Geography of Malta

References

Hills of Malta
Għargħur
Magħtab